The governor of Alaska (Iñupiaq: Alaaskam kavanaa) is the head of government of Alaska. The governor is the chief executive of the state and is the holder of the highest office in the executive branch of the government as well as being the commander in chief of the Alaska's state forces.

Twelve people have served as governor of the State of Alaska over 14 distinct terms, though Alaska had over 30 civilian and military governors during its long history as a United States territory. Only two governors, William A. Egan and Bill Walker, were born in Alaska. Two people, Egan and Wally Hickel, have been elected to multiple non-consecutive terms as governor. Hickel is also noted for a rare third party win in American politics, having been elected to a term in 1990 representing the Alaskan Independence Party. The longest-serving governor of the state was Egan, who was elected three times and served nearly 12 years. The longest-serving territorial governor was Ernest Gruening, who served over 13 years.

The current governor is Republican Mike Dunleavy, who took office on December 3, 2018.

Governors before statehood
Alaska was purchased by the United States from the Russian Empire in 1867, with formal transfer occurring on October 18, 1867, which is now celebrated as Alaska Day. Before then, it was known as Russian America or Russian Alaska, controlled by the governors and general managers of the Russian-American Company.

Commanders of the Department of Alaska
The vast region was initially designated the Department of Alaska, under the jurisdiction of the Department of War and administered by Army officers until 1877, when the Army was withdrawn from Alaska. The Department of the Treasury then took control, with the Collector of Customs as the highest ranking federal official in the territory. In 1879, the Navy was given jurisdiction over the department.

Some believe the first American administrator of Alaska was Polish immigrant Włodzimierz Krzyżanowski. However, the Anchorage Daily News was unable to find any conclusive information to support this claim.

Governors of the District of Alaska
On May 17, 1884, the Department of Alaska was redesignated the District of Alaska, an incorporated but unorganized territory with a civil government. The governor was appointed by the president of the United States.

Governors of the Territory of Alaska
The District of Alaska was organized into Alaska Territory on August 24, 1912. Governors continued to be appointed by the president of the United States.

Governors of the State of Alaska
Alaska was admitted to the Union on January 3, 1959.

The state constitution provides for the election of a governor and lieutenant governor every four years on the same ticket, with their terms commencing on the first Monday in the December following the election. Governors are allowed to succeed themselves once, having to wait four years after their second term in a row before being allowed to run again. Should the office of governor become vacant, the lieutenant governor assumes the office of governor. The original constitution of 1956 created the office of secretary of state, which was functionally identical to a lieutenant governor, and was renamed to "lieutenant governor" in 1970.

See also
 Gubernatorial lines of succession in the United States#Alaska
 List of Alaska State Legislatures
 List of governors of dependent territories in the 19th century
 List of governors of dependent territories in the 20th century

Notes

References
General

 
 
 
 

Constitution

 

Specific

External links

 Office of the Governor of Alaska

 
Governors of Alaska
Lists of state governors of the United States
Lists of territorial governors of the United States
Political history of Alaska